Lado Chikhladze (born 15 June 1985) is a Georgian former professional tennis player.

Chikhladze, a junior doubles finalist at the 2003 French Open, was a member of the Georgia Davis Cup team from 2004 to 2010. He appeared in a total of 16 ties, winning ten singles and nine doubles rubbers. All nine of his doubles wins came partnering Irakli Labadze, which is a Georgian record for a doubles pair.

While competing on the professional tour he had a best singles ranking of 350 in the world and won seven ITF Futures titles. His career was interrupted by a life-threatening neck injury he received in December 2007, when he jumped into a pond and hit his head on the bottom, causing a broken neck. A year later, following several months of bed rest, he was able to make a comeback to professional tennis. In 2012 he played in the qualifying draw for the BMW Open, an ATP Tour tournament in Munich.

References

External links
 
 
 

1985 births
Living people
Male tennis players from Georgia (country)
Sportspeople from Tbilisi